Sechrist Peak is a peak (1,350 m) on the southwest spur of the Mount Murphy massif in Marie Byrd Land. Mapped by United States Geological Survey (USGS) from surveys and U.S. Navy air photos, 1959–66. Named by Advisory Committee on Antarctic Names (US-ACAN) for Frank S. Sechrist, U.S. Exchange Scientist at the Soviet Molodezhnaya station in 1975.

Mountains of Marie Byrd Land